Ruman is a surname. Notable people with the surname include:

Amy Ruman (born 1974), American racing driver
Evgeny Ruman (born 1979), Israeli film director
Petr Ruman (born 1976), Czech footballer
Sig Ruman (1884–1967), German-American actor
Um Ruman (7th century), sahaba of Muhammad